SkyDrive is a Tokyo-based eVTOL company.

History 
SkyDrive was founded in 2018. It was preceded by eventual acquirer Cartivator, which began on work on flying cars in 2012. Cartivator was initially financed in part by Toyota.

The first test flight of the SD-02 came in August, 2020.

In 2022 the company entered a partnership with Suzuki.

Organization 
SkyDrive's CEO is Tomohiro Fukuzawa and the CTO is industry veteran Nobuo Kishi.

Vehicles 
SkyDrive has flown small single-seat multicopter concept vehicles.

SD-02/3 
The SD-03 multicopter test vehicle stands on helicopter struts.

SD-XX 
Its SD-XX concept model is a tandem two-seat design. It is a coaxial octocopter with a glass-covered cabin. Flight time is 20 to 30 minutes.

It has three wheels that enable driving on roads. Two are beneath the cabin, and a third trails behind.

It is targeted at air taxi markets.

References

External links 

 
 

EVTOL aircraft
Japanese business aircraft